Vivid Entertainment Group is an American pornographic film production company, featuring  internet content.

Overview

Vivid Entertainment is privately owned by Americans Steven Hirsch and Bill Asher, and Welshman David James.

In 2006, Vivid Entertainment was described by Reuters as one of the handful of studios that dominate the U.S. porn industry. It is based in Los Angeles, California. Founder Steven Hirsch is co-chairman, along with Bill Asher, who is also a co-owner.

In February 2006, Vivid changed its condom-only policy to a condom-optional policy that lets performers decide whether to use them. In October 2010, Vivid stopped production as a precaution when an actor tested positive for HIV. An October 2012 open letter, from Steven Hirsch, took aim at a Los Angeles County plan that would require performers to wear condoms on set. Hirsch said the proposal would be costly and ineffective and was an example of unnecessary government intrusion into private bedrooms.

Divisions and ventures
Alt-porn: In 2009, the company won the AVN Award for Best Music Soundtrack for The Bad Luck Betties, and in 2010, for the musical soundtrack of Live in My Secrets.
Vivid Radio: Vivid supplied content for a channel on the Sirius XM Radio network that features its various stars. The channel moved to online only on July 17, 2014.

List of Vivid Girls

The following is a list of notable Vivid actresses (known as "Vivid Girls") during the first thirty years of Vivid. The most recent Vivid Girl, Allie Haze, terminated her contract with Vivid in 2012.

Legal controversy
On December 6, 2007, Vivid Entertainment filed a copyright infringement lawsuit against PornoTube. The lawsuit alleged that the YouTube-like site profits from the illegal posting of Vivid's copyrighted films, and failed to comply with the Child Protection and Obscenity Enforcement Act, a federal age-verification and record-keeping law that applies to the adult film industry. The case was settled out of court.

Awards and recognition

References

External links
 
 

American pornographic film studios
Companies based in Los Angeles
Film production companies of the United States
Pornography in Los Angeles
American companies established in 1984
1984 establishments in California